HSwMS Sundsvall (K24) is a Swedish Navy , named after the northern Swedish coastal city of Sundsvall. The ship was launched in 1991 and entered naval service in 1993.

Together with its sister ship HSwMS Gävle, HSwMS Sundsvall took part in the United Nations operation off the coast of Lebanon following the 2006 war between Israel and Hezbollah.

The ship was modified between 2018 and 2022 and returned to active service in December 2022. The modification included new modern sensors, a new command bridge. The aft 40mm canon was removed and replaced by a new deckhouse.

References 

Göteborg-class corvettes
Corvettes of Sweden
1991 ships
Ships built in Sweden